This is an incomplete list of newspapers published in colonial Dahomey and modern Benin, ordered by date of establishment (where known).

Colonial era

L'Echo du Dahomey - established 1905
Recadaire de Behanzin - established 1915
Le Guide du Dahomey -  1920-22
Le Messager Dahoméan - established 1920
La Voix du Dahomey -  1927-1950s
Le Phare du Dahomey - established 1929
La Presse Porto-Novienne -  1931 to date
La Revue Porto-Novoienne, La Quinzaine Dahoméennee - established 1932
L'Etoile du Dahomey - established 1932
L'Echo des Cercles du Dahomey - established 1933
La Dépeche Dahoméenne - established 1938

Modern Benin

La Nation - formerly Ehuzu
La Nouvelle Tribune

See also
 Media of Benin
 List of radio stations in Africa: Benin

References

Bibliography

External links 
 
 
 

Newspapers published in Benin
Benin
newspapers